Karl Birger Asplund (born 21 July 1929)  is a retired Swedish hammer thrower.  He represented his native country at the 1956, 1960 and 1964 Olympics with the best result of 21st place in 1964. At the 1958 European Athletics Championships he placed sixth, setting a national record.

Asplund won 15 consecutive national titles in 1954–68 and became the Nordic champion in 1961 and 1963. Before 1964 he improved the national record 17 times. In 1970 Asplund set the Masters M40 World Record at 64.70 m. It was broken almost two years later by Hal Connolly, the 1956 Olympic champion. Ashland's record was more than a meter and a half further than Connolly threw in the Olympics.

References

Living people
1929 births
Swedish male hammer throwers
Athletes (track and field) at the 1956 Summer Olympics
Athletes (track and field) at the 1960 Summer Olympics
Athletes (track and field) at the 1964 Summer Olympics
Olympic athletes of Sweden